The Marquises and Dukes of Montferrat were the rulers of a territory in Piedmont south of the Po and east of Turin called Montferrat. The March of Montferrat was created by Berengar II of Italy in 950 during a redistribution of power in the northwest of his kingdom. It was originally named after and held by the Aleramici. In 1574, Montferrat was raised to a Duchy by Maximilian II, Holy Roman Emperor (see Duchy of Montferrat).

Marquises

Aleramici dynasty

William I (d. 933 or before)
Aleramo (933–967)
William II, son and co-ruler
Otto I (967–991), son
William III  (991 – bef. 1042), son
Otto II (bef. 1042 – c. 1084), son
Henry (d. 1045), brother and co-ruler
William IV  (c. 1084 – c. 1100), son
Rainier (c. 1100 – c. 1136), son
William V (c. 1136–1191), son
Conrad (1191–1192), son
Boniface I (1192–1207), brother
William VI  (1207–1225), son
Boniface II (1225–1253/55), son
William VII (1253/55–1292), son
John I (1292–1305), son

Paleologo dynasty

Theodore I (1306–1338), nephew of John
John II (1338–1372), son
Secondotto, also known as Otto III (1372–1378), son
John III (1378–1381), brother
Theodore II (1381–1418), brother
John Jacob (1418–1445), son
John IV (1445–1464), son
William VIII (1464–1483), brother
Boniface III (1483–1494), brother
William IX (1494–1518), son. (Father-in-law to Federico II, Duke of Mantua.)
Boniface IV (1518–1530), son, under the regency of his mother Anne of Alençon
John George (1530–1533), uncle
Spanish occupation until 1536.

 Margaret of Montferrat (1533–1536), daughter of William IX and Anne of Alençon, and Marchioness of Montferrat in her own right.

Gonzaga dynasty

In 1536 Charles V, Holy Roman Emperor granted the marquisate, despite competing claims from Savoy and from the Marquis of Saluzzo, to the Gonzagas. This was confirmed in 1559 by the Peace of Cateau-Cambrésis.
 Frederick Gonzaga (1536–1540), Duke of Mantua. Married to Margaret of Montferrat, daughter of William IX and Anne of Alençon, and Marchioness of Montferrat in her own right.
 Francis I (1540–1550), Duke of Mantua, Marquis of Montferrat. Son of Margaret of Montferrat and Frederick Gonzaga.
 Guglielmo I Gonzaga (1550–1574), Duke of Mantua, Marquis until 1574, then duke. Son of Margaret of Montferrat and Frederick Gonzaga

Dukes

Gonzaga dynasty
 William X (1574–1587), Duke of Mantua, Duke of Montferrat from 1574, previously marquis
 Vincent I (1587–1612), Duke of Mantua and Montferrat. Son of William X
 Francis II (1612), Duke of Mantua and Montferrat. Son of Vincent I
 Ferdinand (1612–26), Duke of Mantua and Montferrat. Son of Vincent I.
 Vincent II (1626–27), Duke of Mantua and Montferrat. Son of Vincent I.
 War of the Mantuan Succession (1627–1631) – a portion was lost to Duchy of Savoy
 Maria, Duchess of Montferrat 1612–61, also Duchess of Mantua 1627–1631. Daughter of Francis II.
 Charles I, called "of Nevers", Duke of Montferrat (1627–1637), also Duke of Mantua and Nevers. Father-in-law of Maria, co-ruler with Maria and his son, Charles.
 Charles II (1637–1665). Also Duke of Nevers until 1659. Son of Maria, grandson of both Charles I and Francis II.
 Ferdinand Charles (1665–1708), Duke of Montferrat and Mantua. Son of Charles II.

Savoy dynasty
The House of Savoy gained part of the duchy after the War of the Mantuan Succession and the remainder in 1708. The head of the family used the title of Duke of Montferrat from 1631 until 1861. In addition, the title was granted to some younger sons of the House:
 Prince Amadeus, Duke of Montferrat (1754–1755), second son of Victor Amadeus III of Sardinia
 Prince Maurizio, Duke of Montferrat (1762–1799) third son of Victor Amadeus III 
 Prince Oddone, Duke of Montferrat (1846–1866), third son of Victor Emmanuel II of Italy.

Notes

Bibliography
 
 Circolo Culturale I Marchesi del Monferrato (external link to website devoted to dynastic history)
 Haberstumpf, Walter. Dinastie europee nel Mediterraneo orientale. I Monferrato e i Savoia nei secoli XII–XV, 1995 (external link to downloadable text).
 The Margraves of Montferrat and Kings of Thessalonica, 961–1573 AD
 Usseglio, Leopoldo. I Marchesi di Monferrato in Italia ed in Oriente durante i secoli XII e XIII, 1926.

Montferrat
Montferrat, rulers
Montferrat